"I Wanna Make You Feel Good" is a dance-pop song released in 1984 by The System. The song appears on the album X-Periment. B-side of the single is "Promises Can Break", another song from the album. The single version was a moderate hit in the United Kingdom, reaching number 73 on UK Singles Chart. It was also a minor radio hit.

1984 release 

12" vinyl
 UK: Polydor / POSPX-685

Personnel
Songwriter, producer: David Frank
Songwriter, producer: Mic Murphy
Songwriter:  Paul Pesco

References

1984 songs
The System (band) songs
Songs written by David Frank (musician)
Songs written by Mic Murphy
Songs written by Paul Pesco
Dance-pop songs
Mirage Records singles
Polydor Records singles